Harry Finchett (26 September 1900 – 17 October 1968) was a British gymnast. He competed at the 1920 Summer Olympics, the 1924 Summer Olympics and the 1928 Summer Olympics.

References

External links
 

1900 births
1968 deaths
British male artistic gymnasts
Olympic gymnasts of Great Britain
Gymnasts at the 1920 Summer Olympics
Gymnasts at the 1924 Summer Olympics
Gymnasts at the 1928 Summer Olympics
Sportspeople from Birmingham, West Midlands